Surgan-e Olya (also Romanized as Sūrgān-e ‘Olyā; also known as Sūrgāvan-e ‘Olyā) is a village in Nehzatabad Rural District, in the Central District of Rudbar-e Jonubi County, Kerman Province, Iran. At the 2006 census, its population was 143, in 25 families.

References 

Populated places in Rudbar-e Jonubi County